Lautaro José Belleggia (born 21 March 1997) is an Argentine professional footballer who plays as a midfielder for Primera Nacional side Gimnasia Jujuy.

Career
Belleggia was promoted into Argentine Primera División side Olimpo's first-team squad during the 2016–17 campaign, he was an unused substitute four times prior to making his professional debut on 10 April 2017 versus Defensa y Justicia; he was substituted on four minutes into a 1–1 draw for Martín Pérez Guedes.

Career statistics
.

References

External links

1997 births
Living people
Sportspeople from Buenos Aires Province
Argentine footballers
Association football midfielders
Argentine Primera División players
Olimpo footballers
Gimnasia y Esgrima de Jujuy footballers